Golden hour may refer to:

 Golden hour (medicine), the first sixty minutes after major traumatic injury
 Golden hour (photography), the first hour after dawn and the last hour before dusk
 Golden hour, the first hour of post-natal life, important to breastfeeding

Music
 Golden Hour (Sevish album), 2010
 Golden Hour (Kacey Musgraves album), 2018
 Golden Hour (Kygo album), 2020
 "Golden Hour", a 2022 song by Hrvy
 "Golden Hour" (song)", a 2022 song by JVKE
 "Golden Hours", a song by Brian Eno from his 1975 album Another Green World

Other
 Golden Hours (magazine), an American juvenile magazine
 A term for prime time in several countries
 Golden Hour, an episode of Ninjago: Reimagined

See also
 The Golden Hour (disambiguation)